Mangalya is a 1991 Indian Kannada-language drama film, directed by B. Subba Rao and produced by D. Rama Naidu. The film is a remake of 1973 Telugu film Jeevana Tarangalu which was based on the novel Jeevana Tarangalu by Yaddanapudi Sulochana Rani.

The film stars Malashri, Sridhar, Sunil and Vani Viswanath. The film's music was composed by Rajan–Nagendra and the audio was launched on the Lahari Music banner.

Cast 

Malashri 
Sridhar
Srinath
Sunil
Vani Viswanath
Vajramuni
Abhijith
Vaishali Kasaravalli
Shivaram
Hema Chowdhary in guest appearance
D. Rama Naidu in guest appearance
Bangalore Nagesh
Mandeep Roy
Keerthiraj
Gayatri Prabhakar

Soundtrack 
The music of the film was composed by Rajan–Nagendra, with lyrics by Chi. Udaya Shankar.

References 

1991 films
1990s Kannada-language films
Indian drama films
Kannada remakes of Telugu films
Films based on Indian novels
Films scored by Rajan–Nagendra
Films directed by B. A. Subba Rao

kn:ಮಾಂಗಲ್ಯ